The 2005 United States state legislative elections were held on November 8, 2005. Two legislative chambers in two states held regularly-scheduled elections. These off-year elections coincided with other state and local elections, including gubernatorial elections in two states. Both chambers of the Northern Mariana Islands legislature was up. 

Democrats maintained control of the New Jersey General Assembly and Republicans maintained control of the Virginia House of Delegates.

Summary table 
Regularly-scheduled elections were held in 8 of the 99 state legislative chambers in the United States. Nationwide, regularly-scheduled elections were held for 578 of the 7,383 legislative seats. This table only covers regularly-scheduled elections; additional special elections took place concurrently with these regularly-scheduled elections.

Results

State-by-state

Lower houses

Results

Territories

Upper houses

Lower houses

See also 
 2005 United States gubernatorial elections

Notes

References 

 
State legislative elections
State legislature elections in the United States by year